Arbelodes haberlandorum is a moth in the family Metarbelidae. It is found in South Africa, where it has been recorded from the Cederberg. The habitat consists of submontane and montane riparian areas.

The length of the forewings is about 11 mm. The forewings are pale smoke grey with light greyish olive and olivaceous black striae and patches. The hindwings are glossy light greyish olive.

Etymology
The species is named for the grandparents of the author.

References

Natural History Museum Lepidoptera generic names catalog

Endemic moths of South Africa
Moths described in 2010
Metarbelinae